Vokesimurex donmoorei is a species of sea snail, a marine gastropod mollusk in the family Muricidae, the murex snails or rock snails.

Description
This spiny species attains 45 mm, and possibly larger.

Distribution
Caribbean Sea, Colombia and North coast of South America.

References

Gastropods described in 1964
Vokesimurex